Harry Belafonte (born Harold George Bellanfanti Jr.; March 1, 1927) is an American singer, activist, and actor. As arguably the most successful Caribbean-American pop star, he popularized the Trinbagonian Calypso musical style with an international audience in the 1950s. His breakthrough album Calypso (1956) was the first million-selling LP by a single artist.

Belafonte is best known for his recordings of  "The Banana Boat Song", with its signature "Day-O" lyric, "Jump in the Line", and "Jamaica Farewell". He has recorded and performed in many genres, including blues, folk, gospel, show tunes, and American standards. He has also starred in several films, including Carmen Jones (1954), Island in the Sun (1957), and Odds Against Tomorrow (1959).

Belafonte considered the actor, singer and activist Paul Robeson a mentor, and he was a close confidant of Martin Luther King Jr. during the Civil Rights Movement of the 1950s and 1960s. As he later recalled, "Paul Robeson had been my first great formative influence; you might say he gave me my backbone. Martin King was the second; he nourished my soul." Throughout his career, Belafonte has been an advocate for political and humanitarian causes, such as the Anti-Apartheid Movement and USA for Africa. Since 1987, he has been a UNICEF Goodwill Ambassador. He was a vocal critic of the policies of the George W. Bush presidential administrations. Belafonte acts as the American Civil Liberties Union celebrity ambassador for juvenile justice issues.

Belafonte has won three Grammy Awards (including a Grammy Lifetime Achievement Award), an Emmy Award, and a Tony Award. In 1989, he received the Kennedy Center Honors. He was awarded the National Medal of Arts in 1994. In 2014, he received the Jean Hersholt Humanitarian Award at the Academy's 6th Annual Governors Awards and in 2022 was inducted into the Rock and Roll Hall of Fame in the Early Influence category and is the oldest living person to have received the honor.

Early life
Belafonte was born Harold George Bellanfanti Jr. at Lying-in Hospital on March 1, 1927, in Harlem, New York, the son of Jamaican-born parents Harold George Bellanfanti Sr., who worked as a chef, and Melvine (née Love), a housekeeper. His mother was the child of a Scottish Jamaican mother and an Afro-Jamaican father, and his father was the child of a Black American mother and a Dutch-Jewish father of Sephardic Jewish descent. Harry, Jr. was raised Catholic.

From 1932 to 1940, Belafonte lived with one of his grandmothers in her native country of Jamaica, where he attended Wolmer's Schools. Upon returning to New York City, he attended George Washington High School after which he joined the Navy and served during World War II. In the 1940s, he was working as a janitor's assistant when a tenant gave him, as a gratuity, two tickets to see the American Negro Theater. He fell in love with the art form and also became friends with Sidney Poitier. The financially struggling pair regularly purchased a single seat to local plays, trading places in between acts, after informing the other about the progression of the play. At the end of the 1940s, he took classes in acting at the Dramatic Workshop of The New School in New York with the influential German director Erwin Piscator alongside Marlon Brando, Tony Curtis, Walter Matthau, Bea Arthur, and Poitier, while performing with the American Negro Theater. He subsequently received a Tony Award for his participation in the Broadway revue John Murray Anderson's Almanac (1954). He also starred in the 1955 Broadway revue 3 for Tonight with Gower Champion.

Musical career
Belafonte started his career in music as a club singer in New York to pay for his acting classes. The first time he appeared in front of an audience, he was backed by the Charlie Parker band, which included Charlie Parker himself, Max Roach and Miles Davis, among others. He launched his recording career as a pop singer on the Roost label in 1949, but quickly developed a keen interest in folk music, learning material through the Library of Congress' American folk songs archives. With guitarist and friend Millard Thomas, Belafonte soon made his debut at the legendary jazz club The Village Vanguard. He signed a contract with RCA Victor in 1953, recording regularly for the label until 1974.

Belafonte also performed during the Rat Pack era in Las Vegas. He and associated acts such as Liberace, Ray Vasquez, and Sammy Davis Jr. were featured at the Sands Hotel and Casino and the Dunes Hotel.

Calypso
Belafonte's first widely released single, which went on to become his "signature" audience participation song in virtually all his live performances, was "Matilda", recorded April 27, 1953. His breakthrough album Calypso (1956) became the first LP in the world "to sell over 1 million copies within a year", Belafonte confirmed on the Canadian Broadcasting Corporation's The Link program on August 7, 2012. He added that it was also the first million-selling album ever in England. The album is number four on Billboards "Top 100 Album" list for having spent 31 weeks at number 1, 58 weeks in the top ten, and 99 weeks on the U.S. charts. The album introduced American audiences to calypso music (which had originated in Trinidad and Tobago in the early 20th century), and Belafonte was dubbed the "King of Calypso", a title he wore with reservations since he had no claims to any Calypso Monarch titles.

One of the songs included in the album is the now famous "Banana Boat Song" (listed as "Day-O" on the Calypso LP), which reached number five on the pop charts, and featured its signature lyric "Day-O".

Many of the compositions recorded for Calypso, including "Banana Boat Song" and "Jamaica Farewell", gave songwriting credit to Irving Burgie.

Middle career

While primarily known for calypso, Belafonte has recorded in many different genres, including blues, folk, gospel, show tunes, and American standards. His second-most popular hit, which came immediately after "The Banana Boat Song", was the comedic tune "Mama Look at Bubu", also known as "Mama Look a Boo-Boo" (originally recorded by Lord Melody in 1955), in which he sings humorously about misbehaving and disrespectful children. It reached number eleven on the pop chart.

In 1959, Belafonte starred in Tonight With Belafonte, a nationally televised special that featured Odetta, who sang "Water Boy" and who performed a duet with Belafonte of "There's a Hole in My Bucket" that hit the national charts in 1961. Belafonte was the first Jamaican American to win an Emmy, for Revlon Revue: Tonight with Belafonte (1959). Two live albums, both recorded at Carnegie Hall in 1959 and 1960, enjoyed critical and commercial success. From his 1959 album, "Hava Nagila" became part of his regular routine and one of his signature songs. He was one of many entertainers recruited by Frank Sinatra to perform at the inaugural gala of President John F. Kennedy in 1961. Later that year, RCA Victor released another calypso album, Jump Up Calypso, which went on to become another million seller. During the 1960s he introduced several artists to American audiences, most notably South African singer Miriam Makeba and Greek singer Nana Mouskouri. His album Midnight Special (1962) included a young harmonica player named Bob Dylan.

As the Beatles and other stars from Britain began to dominate the U.S. pop charts, Belafonte's commercial success diminished; 1964's Belafonte at The Greek Theatre was his last album to appear in Billboards Top 40. His last hit single, "A Strange Song", was released in 1967 and peaked at number 5 on the adult contemporary music charts. Belafonte has received Grammy Awards for the albums Swing Dat Hammer (1960) and An Evening with Belafonte/Makeba (1965). The latter album dealt with the political plight of black South Africans under apartheid. He earned six Gold Records.

During the 1960s, Belafonte appeared on TV specials alongside such artists as Julie Andrews, Petula Clark, Lena Horne, and Nana Mouskouri. In 1967, Belafonte was the first non-classical artist to perform at the prestigious Saratoga Performing Arts Center (SPAC) in Upstate New York, soon to be followed by concerts there by the Doors, the 5th Dimension, the Who, and Janis Joplin.

From February 5 to 9, 1968, Belafonte guest hosted The Tonight Show substituting for Johnny Carson. Among his interview guests were Martin Luther King Jr. and Sen. Robert F. Kennedy.

Later recordings and other activities

Belafonte's fifth and final calypso album, Calypso Carnival, was issued by RCA in 1971.
Belafonte's recording activity slowed considerably after releasing his final album for RCA in 1974. From the mid-1970s to early 1980s, Belafonte spent the greater part of his time on tour, which included concerts in Japan, Europe, and Cuba. In 1977, Columbia Records  released the album Turn the World Around, with a strong focus on world music. Columbia never issued the album in the United States. He subsequently was a guest star on an episode of The Muppet Show in 1978, in which he performed his signature song "Day-O". However, the episode is best known for Belafonte's rendition of the spiritual song "Turn the World Around", from the album of the same name, which he performed with specially made Muppets that resembled African tribal masks. After Henson's death in May 1990, Belafonte was asked to perform the song at Henson's memorial service. "Turn the World Around" was also included in the 2005 official hymnal supplement of the Unitarian Universalist Association, Singing the Journey.

Belafonte's involvement in USA for Africa during the mid-1980s resulted in renewed interest in his music, culminating in a record deal with EMI. He subsequently released his first album of original material in over a decade, Paradise in Gazankulu, in 1988. The album contains ten protest songs against the South African former Apartheid policy and is his last studio album. In the same year Belafonte, as UNICEF Goodwill Ambassador, attended a symposium in Harare, Zimbabwe, to focus attention on child survival and development in Southern African countries. As part of the symposium, he performed a concert for UNICEF. A Kodak video crew filmed the concert, which was released as a 60-minute concert video titled "Global Carnival". It features many of the songs from the album Paradise in Gazankulu and some of his classic hits. That same year, four Belafonte songs—"Day-O (The Banana Boat Song)", "Man Smart, Woman Smarter", "Sweetheart from Venezuela", and "Jump in the Line (Shake, Senora)"—were featured in the film Beetlejuice, directed by Tim Burton.

Following a lengthy recording hiatus, An Evening with Harry Belafonte and Friends, a soundtrack and video of a televised concert, were released in 1997 by Island Records. The Long Road to Freedom: An Anthology of Black Music, a huge multi-artist project recorded by RCA during the 1960s and 1970s, was finally released by the label in 2001. Belafonte went on the Today Show to promote the album on September 11, 2001, and was interviewed by Katie Couric just minutes before the first plane hit the World Trade Center. The album was nominated for the 2002 Grammy Awards for Best Boxed Recording Package, for Best Album Notes, and for Best Historical Album.

Belafonte received the Kennedy Center Honors in 1989. He was awarded the National Medal of Arts in 1994 and he won a Grammy Lifetime Achievement Award in 2000. He performed sold-out concerts globally through the 1950s to the 2000s. Owing to illness, he was forced to cancel a reunion tour with Nana Mouskouri planned for the spring and summer of 2003 following a tour in Europe. His last concert was a benefit concert for the Atlanta Opera on October 25, 2003. In a 2007 interview, he stated that he had since retired from performing.

On January 29, 2013, Belafonte was the Keynote Speaker and 2013 Honoree for the MLK Celebration Series at the Rhode Island School of Design. Belafonte used his career and experiences with Dr. King to speak on the role of artists as activists.

Belafonte was inducted as an honorary member of Phi Beta Sigma fraternity on January 11, 2014.

In March 2014, Belafonte was awarded an honorary doctorate from Berklee College of Music in Boston.

In 2017, Belafonte released When Colors Come Together, an anthology of some of Belafonte's earlier recordings produced by his son David who wrote lyrics for an updated version of "Island In The Sun", arranged by longtime Belafonte musical director Richard Cummings, and featuring Harry Belafonte's grandchildren Sarafina and Amadeus and a children's choir.

Film career

Belafonte has starred in numerous films. His first film role was in Bright Road (1953), in which he supported female lead Dorothy Dandridge. The two subsequently starred in Otto Preminger's hit musical Carmen Jones (1954). Ironically, Belafonte's singing in the film was dubbed by an opera singer, as was Dandridge's, both voices being deemed unsuitable for their roles. Using his star clout, Belafonte was subsequently able to realize several then-controversial film roles. In 1957's Island in the Sun, there are hints of an affair between Belafonte's character and the character played by Joan Fontaine. The film also starred James Mason, Dandridge, Joan Collins, Michael Rennie, and John Justin. In 1959, he starred in and produced, through his company HarBel Productions, Robert Wise's Odds Against Tomorrow, in which he plays a bank robber uncomfortably teamed with a racist partner (Robert Ryan). He also co-starred with Inger Stevens in The World, the Flesh and the Devil. Belafonte was offered the role of Porgy in Preminger's Porgy and Bess, where he would have once again starred opposite Dandridge, but he refused the role because he objected to its racial stereotyping; Sidney Poitier played the role instead.

Dissatisfied with most of the film roles offered to him during the 1960s, Belafonte concentrated on music. In the early 1970s, Belafonte appeared in more films, among which are two with Poitier: Buck and the Preacher (1972) and Uptown Saturday Night (1974). In 1984, Belafonte produced and scored the musical film Beat Street, dealing with the rise of hip-hop culture. Together with Arthur Baker, he produced the gold-certified soundtrack of the same name. Belafonte next starred in a major film again in the mid-1990s, appearing with John Travolta in the race-reverse drama White Man's Burden (1995); and in Robert Altman's jazz age drama Kansas City (1996), the latter of which garnered him the New York Film Critics Circle Award for Best Supporting Actor. He also starred as an Associate Justice of the Supreme Court of the United States in the TV drama Swing Vote (1999). In 2006, Belafonte appeared in Bobby, Emilio Estevez's ensemble drama about the assassination of Robert F. Kennedy; he played Nelson, a friend of an employee of the Ambassador Hotel (Anthony Hopkins). He appears in Spike Lee's BlacKkKlansman (2018) as an elderly civil rights pioneer.

Personal life

Belafonte and Marguerite Byrd were married from 1948 to 1957. They have two daughters: Adrienne and Shari Belafonte. They separated when Byrd was pregnant with Shari.  Adrienne and her daughter Rachel Blue founded the Anir Foundation / Experience, focused on humanitarian work in southern Africa. Shari is a photographer, model, singer, and actress and is married to actor Sam Behrens.

In 1953, Belafonte was financially able to move from Washington Heights, Manhattan "into a white neighborhood in Elmhurst, Queens."

Belafonte had an affair with actress Joan Collins during the filming of Island in the Sun.

On March 8, 1957, Belafonte married his second wife Julie Robinson, a former dancer with the Katherine Dunham Company who was of Jewish descent.  They had two children, David and Gina. David, the only son of Harry Belafonte, is a former model and actor and is an Emmy-winning and Grammy nominated music producer and the executive director of the family-held company Belafonte Enterprises Inc. As a music producer, David has been involved in most of Belafonte's albums and tours and productions. He is married to model and singer Malena Belafonte who toured with Belafonte. Gina Belafonte is a TV and film actress and worked with her father as coach and producer on more than six films.

After 47 years of marriage, Belafonte and Robinson divorced. In April 2008, Belafonte married photographer Pamela Frank.

Belafonte has five grandchildren, Rachel and Brian through his children with Marguerite Byrd, and Maria, Sarafina, and Amadeus through his children with Julie Robinson. In October 1998, Belafonte contributed a letter to Liv Ullmann's book Letter to My Grandchild.

Political and humanitarian activism
Belafonte is said to have married politics and pop culture. Belafonte's political beliefs were greatly inspired by the singer, actor and civil rights activist Paul Robeson, who mentored him. Robeson opposed not only racial prejudice in the United States but also western colonialism in Africa. He refused to perform in the American South from 1954 until 1961. In 1960, Belafonte appeared in a campaign commercial for Democratic Presidential candidate John F. Kennedy. Kennedy later named Belafonte cultural advisor to the Peace Corps. Belafonte supported Lyndon B. Johnson for the 1964 United States presidential election.

Belafonte gave the keynote address at the ACLU of Northern California's annual Bill of Rights Day Celebration In December 2007 and was awarded the Chief Justice Earl Warren Civil Liberties Award. The 2011 Sundance Film Festival featured the documentary film Sing Your Song, a biographical film focusing on Belafonte's contribution to and his leadership in the civil rights movement in America and his endeavors to promote social justice globally. In 2011, Belafonte's memoir My Song was published by Knopf Books.

Involvement in the Civil Rights Movement

Belafonte supported the Civil Rights Movement in the 1950s and 1960s and was one of Martin Luther King Jr.'s confidants. He provided for King's family since King made only $8,000 a year as a preacher. Like many other civil rights activists, Belafonte was blacklisted during the McCarthy era. During the 1963 Birmingham Campaign, he bailed King out of Birmingham City Jail and raised $50,000 to release other civil rights protesters. He contributed to the 1961 Freedom Rides, supported voter registration drives, and helped to organize the 1963 March on Washington.

During the "Mississippi Freedom Summer" of 1964, Belafonte bankrolled the Student Nonviolent Coordinating Committee, flying to Mississippi that August with Sidney Poitier and $60,000 in cash and entertaining crowds in Greenwood.
In 1968, Belafonte appeared on a Petula Clark primetime television special on NBC. In the middle of a duet of On the Path of Glory, Clark smiled and briefly touched Belafonte's arm, which prompted complaints from Doyle Lott, the advertising manager of the show's sponsor, Plymouth Motors. Lott wanted to retape the segment, but Clark, who had ownership of the special, told NBC that the performance would be shown intact or she would not allow it to be aired at all. Newspapers reported the controversy, Lott was relieved of his responsibilities, and when the special aired, it attracted high ratings.

In 2005, Belafonte founded The Gathering for Justice after he witnessed news reports of a 5-year-old Black girl, Jaiesha Scott, being handcuffed and arrested in her Florida classroom for “being unruly”. After dedicating his life to the Civil Rights movement, and seeing so many gains, he was struck in that moment with the distance left to go. The mission of The Gathering for Justice is to end child incarceration and eliminate the racial inequities that permeate the justice system. The Gathering for Justice has two state-based task forces, Justice League NYC (established in 2013) and Justice League California (established in 2017), both of which bring together juvenile and criminal justice experts, advocates, artists and individuals who’ve experienced or been impacted by incarceration directly.

Belafonte taped an appearance on an episode of The Smothers Brothers Comedy Hour to be aired on September 29, 1968, performing a controversial "Mardi Gras" number intercut with footage from the 1968 Democratic National Convention riots. CBS censors deleted the segment. The full unedited content was broadcast in 1993 as part of a complete Smothers Brothers Hour syndication package.

Humanitarian activism 

In 1985, Belafonte helped organize the Grammy Award-winning song "We Are the World", a multi-artist effort to raise funds for Africa. He performed in the Live Aid concert that same year. In 1987, he received an appointment to UNICEF as a goodwill ambassador. Following his appointment, Belafonte traveled to Dakar, Senegal, where he served as chairman of the International Symposium of Artists and Intellectuals for African Children. He also helped to raise funds—alongside more than 20 other artists—in the largest concert ever held in sub-Saharan Africa. In 1994, he went on a mission to Rwanda and launched a media campaign to raise awareness of the needs of Rwandan children.

In 2001, Belafonte went to South Africa to support the campaign against HIV/AIDS. In 2002, Africare awarded him the Bishop John T. Walker Distinguished Humanitarian Service Award for his efforts to assist Africa. In 2004, Belafonte went to Kenya to stress the importance of educating children in the region.

Belafonte has been involved in prostate cancer advocacy since 1996, when he was diagnosed and successfully treated for the disease. On June 27, 2006, Belafonte was the recipient of the BET Humanitarian Award at the 2006 BET Awards. He was named one of nine 2006 Impact Award recipients by AARP The Magazine. On October 19, 2007, Belafonte represented UNICEF on Norwegian television to support the annual telethon (TV Aksjonen) in support of that charity and helped raise a world record of $10 per inhabitant of Norway. Belafonte was also an ambassador for the Bahamas. He is on the board of directors of the Advancement Project. He also serves on the Advisory Council of the Nuclear Age Peace Foundation.

Political activism 

Belafonte has been a longtime critic of U.S. foreign policy. He began making controversial political statements on this subject in the early 1980s. He has at various times made statements opposing the U.S. embargo on Cuba; praising Soviet peace initiatives; attacking the U.S. invasion of Grenada; praising the Abraham Lincoln Brigade; honoring Ethel and Julius Rosenberg and praising Fidel Castro. Belafonte is additionally known for his visit to Cuba which helped ensure hip-hop's place in Cuban society. According to Geoffrey Baker's article "Hip hop, Revolucion! Nationalizing Rap in Cuba", in 1999, Belafonte met with representatives of the rap community immediately before meeting with Fidel Castro. This meeting resulted in Castro's personal approval of, and hence the government's involvement in, the incorporation of rap into his country's culture. In a 2003 interview, Belafonte reflected upon this meeting's influence:

"When I went back to Havana a couple years later, the people in the hip-hop community came to see me and we hung out for a bit. They thanked me profusely and I said, 'Why?' and they said, 'Because your little conversation with Fidel and the Minister of Culture on hip-hop led to there being a special division within the ministry and we've got our own studio'."

Belafonte was active in the Anti-Apartheid Movement. He was the Master of Ceremonies at a reception honoring African National Congress President Oliver Tambo at Roosevelt House, Hunter College, in New York City. The reception was held by the American Committee on Africa (ACOA) and The Africa Fund. He is a current board member of the TransAfrica Forum and the Institute for Policy Studies.

Opposition to the George W. Bush administration
Belafonte achieved widespread attention for his political views in 2002 when he began making a series of comments about President George W. Bush, his administration and the Iraq War. During an interview with Ted Leitner for San Diego's 760 KFMB, on October 10, 2002, Belafonte referred to a quote made by Malcolm X. Belafonte said:

Belafonte used the quote to characterize former United States Secretaries of State Colin Powell and Condoleezza Rice, Powell and Rice both responded, with Powell calling the remarks "unfortunate" and Rice saying: "I don't need Harry Belafonte to tell me what it means to be black."

The comment was brought up again in an interview with Amy Goodman for Democracy Now! in 2006. In January 2006, Belafonte led a delegation of activists including actor Danny Glover and activist/professor Cornel West to meet with President of Venezuela Hugo Chávez. In 2005, Chávez, an outspoken Bush critic, initiated a program to provide cheaper heating oil for poor people in several areas of the United States. Belafonte supported this initiative. He was quoted as saying, during the meeting with Chávez, "No matter what the greatest tyrant in the world, the greatest terrorist in the world, George W. Bush says, we're here to tell you: Not hundreds, not thousands, but millions of the American people support your revolution." Belafonte and Glover met again with Chávez in 2006. The comment ignited a great deal of controversy. Hillary Clinton refused to acknowledge Belafonte's presence at an awards ceremony that featured both of them. AARP, which had just named him one of its 10 Impact Award honorees 2006, released this statement following the remarks: "AARP does not condone the manner and tone which he has chosen and finds his comments completely unacceptable." During a Martin Luther King Jr. Day speech at Duke University in 2006, Belafonte compared the American government to the hijackers of the September 11 attacks, saying: "What is the difference between that terrorist and other terrorists?"  In response to criticism about his remarks Belafonte asked, "What do you call Bush when the war he put us in to date has killed almost as many Americans as died on 9/11 and the number of Americans wounded in war is almost triple? ... By most definitions Bush can be considered a terrorist."  When he was asked about his expectation of criticism for his remarks on the war in Iraq, Belafonte responded: "Bring it on. Dissent is central to any democracy."

In another interview, Belafonte remarked that while his comments may have been "hasty", nevertheless he felt the Bush administration suffered from "arrogance wedded to ignorance" and its policies around the world were "morally bankrupt". In January 2006, in a speech to the annual meeting of the Arts Presenters Members Conference, Belafonte referred to "the new Gestapo of Homeland Security" saying, "You can be arrested and have no right to counsel!" During the Martin Luther King Jr. Day speech at Duke University in January 2006, Belafonte said that if he could choose his epitaph it would be, "Harry Belafonte, Patriot."

In 2004, he was awarded the Domestic Human Rights Award in San Francisco by Global Exchange.

Obama administration
In the 1950s, Belafonte was a supporter of the African American Students Foundation, which gave a grant to Barack Obama Sr., the late father of the 44th US president, Barack Obama, to study at the University of Hawaii in 1959.

In 2011, Belafonte commented on the Obama administration and the role which popular opinion played in shaping its policies. "I think [Obama] plays the game that he plays because he sees no threat from evidencing concerns for the poor."

On December 9, 2012, in an interview with Al Sharpton on MSNBC, Belafonte expressed dismay that many political leaders in the United States continue to oppose Obama’s policies even after his re-election: "The only thing left for Barack Obama to do is to work like a third-world dictator and just put all of these guys in jail. You're violating the American desire."

On February 1, 2013, Belafonte received the NAACP's Spingarn Medal, and in the televised ceremony, he counted Constance L. Rice among those previous recipients of the award whom he regarded highly for speaking up "to remedy the ills of the nation".

NYC Pride 
In 2013, Belafonte was named a Grand Marshal of the New York City Pride Parade, alongside Edie Windsor and Earl Fowlkes.

2016 presidential election
In 2016, Belafonte endorsed Bernie Sanders for the Democratic Primary, saying: "I think he represents opportunity, I think he represents a moral imperative, I think he represents a certain kind of truth that's not often evidenced in the course of politics".

Belafonte was an honorary co-chair of the Women's March on Washington, which took place on January 21, 2017, the day after the inauguration of Donald Trump as president.

The Sanders Institute 
Belafonte is a Fellow at The Sanders Institute, which has a mission to "revitalize democracy by actively engaging individuals, organizations and the media in the pursuit of progressive solutions to economic, environmental, racial and social justice issues."

Business career
Harry Belafonte likes and has often visited the Caribbean island of Bonaire. He and Maurice Neme of Oranjestad, Aruba formed a joint venture to create a luxurious private community on Bonaire. On 3 June 1966, the construction of the neighbourhood started which was named Belnem after Belafonte and Neme. The neighbourhood is managed by the Bel-Nem Caribbean Development Corporation. Belafonte and Neme served as its first directors. In 2017, Belnem was home to 717 people.

Discography

Belafonte has released 30 studio albums and eight live albums, and has achieved critical and commercial success.

Filmography

Television work

Concert videos
 En Gränslös Kväll På Operan (1966)
 Don't Stop The Carnival (1985)
 Global Carnival (1988)
 An Evening with Harry Belafonte and Friends (1997)

Stage work
 John Murray Anderson's Almanac (1953)
 3 for Tonight (1955)
 Moonbirds (1959) (producer)
 Belafonte at the Palace (1959)
 Asinamali! (1987) (producer)

Legacy
Belafonte celebrated his 93rd birthday on March 1, 2020, at Harlem's Apollo Theater in a tribute event that concluded "with a thunderous audience singalong" with rapper Doug E. Fresh to 1956's "Banana Boat Song". Soon after, the New York Public Library's Schomburg Center for Research in Black Culture announced it had acquired Belafonte's vast personal archive - a lifetime's worth of "photographs, recordings, films, letters, artwork, clipping albums," etc.

See also
 List of peace activists

References

Further reading
 
 Smith, Judith. Becoming Belafonte: Black Artist, Public Radical. University of Texas Press, 2014. , .
 Wise, James. Stars in Blue: Movie Actors in America's Sea Services. Annapolis, MD: Naval Institute Press, 1997. . .

External links

SNCC Digital Gateway: Harry Belafonte, Documentary website created by the SNCC Legacy Project and Duke University, telling the story of the Student Nonviolent Coordinating Committee & grassroots organizing from the inside-out

Harry Belafonte at the TCM Movie Database

1927 births
Living people
African-American Catholics
American anti-war activists
American feminists
American folk singers
American male film actors
American male singers
American male stage actors
American musicians of Jamaican descent
American people of Dutch-Jewish descent
American people of Martiniquais descent
American people of Scottish descent
American people of Sephardic-Jewish descent
American socialists
American world music musicians
Calypsonians
Donaldson Award winners
Emmy Award winners
Feminist musicians
George Washington Educational Campus alumni
Grammy Lifetime Achievement Award winners
Jean Hersholt Humanitarian Award winners
Jubilee Records artists
Kennedy Center honorees
Male feminists
Military personnel from New York City
New York (state) socialists
People from Elmhurst, Queens
People from Harlem
People from Washington Heights, Manhattan
RCA Victor artists
Recipients of the Four Freedoms Award
Recipients of the Order of the Companions of O. R. Tambo
Spingarn Medal winners
The New School alumni
Tony Award winners
UNICEF Goodwill Ambassadors
United States National Medal of Arts recipients
United States Navy personnel of World War II
United States Navy sailors